Nurmagomed Magomedsandovich Shanavazov (born February 19, 1965), is a Soviet Dagestani former boxer. He is best known for handing Riddick Bowe his first defeat at an international competition. An ethnic  Dargin hailing from Dagestan, Shanavazov won the Light Heavyweight Silver medal at the 1988 Summer Olympics for the Soviet Union. He was training at the Dynamo sports society in Makhachkala.

Amateur career

At the Soviet-Cuban joint pre-Olympic training camp in Suhumi, Georgian SSR, set for the 1988 Olympics, he sparred with Félix Savón, constantly staggering him with devastating bodyshot flurries at close range. They never met again though as Shanavazov was in the lighter weight class.

Olympic Results
Defeated Patrick Lihanda (Uganda) by majority decision, 4–1
Defeated Markus Bott (West Germany) by majority decision, 4–1
Defeated Andrea Magi (Italy) by majority decision, 4–1
Defeated Damir Škaro (Yugoslavia) by walkover
Lost to Andrew Maynard (United States) by unanimous decision, 0–5

Professional career
Because of poor management and poor performance Shanavazov had no success as a professional. He turned pro in 1990 and also retired that same year, finishing with a record of three fights, zero wins.

Professional boxing record

|-
|align="center" colspan=8|2 Losses (1 knockout, 1 decision), 1 Draw 
|-
| align="center" style="border-style: none none solid solid; background: #e3e3e3"|Record
| align="center" style="border-style: none none solid solid; background: #e3e3e3"|Result
| align="center" style="border-style: none none solid solid; background: #e3e3e3"|Opponent
| align="center" style="border-style: none none solid solid; background: #e3e3e3"|Type
| align="center" style="border-style: none none solid solid; background: #e3e3e3"|Round
| align="center" style="border-style: none none solid solid; background: #e3e3e3"|Date
| align="center" style="border-style: none none solid solid; background: #e3e3e3"|Location
| align="center" style="border-style: none none solid solid; background: #e3e3e3"|Notes
|-
|0–2–1
|Loss
|align=left| Sergei Kobozev
|KO
|2 (8)
|3 Nov 1990
|align=left| Sport Palace Gornyak, Rudniy, Kazakh SSR
|align=left|
|-
|0–1–1
|Draw
|align=left| Sergei Kobozev
|PTS
|8
|30 Sep 1990
|align=left| Rostov-on-Don, RSFSR
|align=left|
|-
|0–1
|Loss
|align=left| Rund Kanika
|PTS
|6
|23 Apr 1990
|align=left| Nogent-sur-Marne, France
|align=left|
|}

References

External links
 
 sports-reference

1965 births
Soviet male boxers
Light-heavyweight boxers
People from Karabudakhkentsky District
Boxers at the 1988 Summer Olympics
Olympic silver medalists for the Soviet Union
Olympic boxers of the Soviet Union
Dynamo sports society athletes
Living people
Olympic medalists in boxing
Russian male boxers
Honoured Masters of Sport of the USSR
AIBA World Boxing Championships medalists
Medalists at the 1988 Summer Olympics
Goodwill Games medalists in boxing
Competitors at the 1986 Goodwill Games
Sportspeople from Dagestan